João Soares may refer to:
 João Soares (politician) (born 1949), Portuguese lawyer and politician
 João Soares (tennis) (born 1951), former tennis player from Brazil
 João Clemente Baena Soares (born 1931), Brazilian diplomat